László Tisza (July 7, 1907 – April 15, 2009) was a Hungarian-born American physicist who was Professor of Physics Emeritus at MIT. He was a colleague of famed physicists Edward Teller, Lev Landau and Fritz London, and initiated the two-fluid theory of liquid helium.

United States
In 1941, Tisza immigrated to the United States and joined the faculty at the Massachusetts Institute of Technology. His research areas included theoretical physics and the history and philosophy of science, specifically on the foundation of thermodynamics and quantum mechanics. He taught at MIT until 1973.

Publications
Tisza was the author of the 1966 book, Generalized Thermodynamics. The 1982 publication, Physics as Natural Philosophy: Essays in Honor of László Tisza, was written by Tisza's colleagues and former students in honor of his 75th birthday.

Affiliations
He was a Fellow of The American Physical Society and American Academy of Arts and Sciences, a John Simon Guggenheim Fellow and had been a visiting professor at the University of Paris in Sorbonne.

See also
Vera and Laszlo Tisza House

References

External links
MIT site – notice of Tisza's death 
John Simon Guggenheim Fellowship site

1907 births
2009 deaths
Scientists from Budapest
Hungarian emigrants to the United States
American centenarians
20th-century American educators
American science writers
20th-century Hungarian physicists
Hungarian centenarians
Massachusetts Institute of Technology School of Science faculty
Writers from Cambridge, Massachusetts
Thermodynamics
Academic staff of the University of Paris
20th-century American non-fiction writers
20th-century American physicists
Fellows of the American Physical Society
Fellows of the American Academy of Arts and Sciences
20th-century American male writers
American male non-fiction writers
Men centenarians